The Men's ski halfpipe competition at the FIS Freestyle Ski and Snowboarding World Championships 2019 was held on February 7 and 9, 2019.

Qualification
The qualification was started on February 6, at 14:00. The ten best snowboarders qualified for the final.

Final
The final was started at 19:16.

References

Men's snowboard halfpipe